The Goos–Hänchen effect (named after Hermann Fritz Gustav Goos (1883 – 1968) and Hilda Hänchen (1919 – 2013) is an optical phenomenon in which linearly polarized light undergoes a small lateral shift when totally internally reflected. The shift is perpendicular to the direction of propagation in the plane containing the incident and reflected beams. This effect is the linear polarization analog of the Imbert–Fedorov effect.

This effect occurs because the reflections of a finite sized beam will interfere along a line transverse to the average propagation direction. As shown in the figure, the superposition of two plane waves with slightly different angles of incidence but with the same frequency or wavelength is given by

where

and

with 
.

It can be shown that the two waves generate an interference pattern transverse to the average propagation direction, 

and on the interface along the  plane.

Both waves are reflected from the surface and undergo different phase shifts, which leads to a lateral shift of the finite beam. Therefore, the Goos–Hänchen effect is a coherence phenomenon.

This effect continues to be a topic of scientific research, for example in the context of nanophotonics applications. A negative Goos–Hänchen shift was shown by Wild and Giles. Sensitive detection of biological molecules is achieved based on measuring the Goos–Hänchen shift, where the signal of lateral change is in a linear relation with the concentration of target molecules. The work by Merano et al. studied the Goos–Hänchen effect experimentally for the case of an optical beam reflecting from a metal surface (gold) at 826 nm. They report a substantial, negative lateral shift of the reflected beam in the plane of incidence for a p-polarization and a smaller, positive shift for the s-polarization case.

Generation of giant Goos-Hänchen shift and their related applications
It is known that the value of lateral position Goos-Hänchen shift is only 5-10 μm at a Total internal reflection interface of water and air, which is very difficult to be experimentally measured. In order to generate a giant Goos-Hänchen shift up to 100 μm, surface plasmon resonance techniques were applied based on an interface between metal/dielectric.  The electrons on the metallic surface are strongly resonant with the optical waves under specific excitation condition. The light has been fully absorbed by the metallic nanostructures and create an extreme dark point the resonance angle. Thus, a giant Goos-Hänchen position shift is generated by this singular dark point at the totally internally reflected interface. This giant Goos-Hänchen shift has been applied not only for highly sensitive detection of biological molecules but also for the observation of Photonic Spin Hall Effect that are important in quantum information processing and communications.

References

 
 
 

Optical phenomena